Filsoniana is a genus of squamulose lichens in the family Teloschistaceae. It has six species. It was circumscribed in 2013 by Ingvar Kärnefelt, Arne Thell, Jae-Seoun Hur, Sergey Kondratyuk, and John Elix following a molecular phylogenetic analysis of the Teloschistaceae. The generic name honours Australian lichenologist Rex Filson, "in recognition of his contribution to lichenology, in particular to the lichen flora of Australia".

Genus Filsoniana is distinguished from Caloplaca by its squamulose thallus that contains anthraquinones, in the tissue structure comprising the rim (exciple) of the apothecia, and in differences in the cortical layer on the underside of the exciple.

Species

Filsoniana australiensis 
Filsoniana ferdinandmuelleri 
Filsoniana kiamae 
Filsoniana lhasanensis  – Tibet
Filsoniana rexfilsonii 
Filsoniana scarlatina

References

Teloschistales
Lichen genera
Teloschistales genera
Taxa described in 2013
Taxa named by John Alan Elix
Taxa named by Ingvar Kärnefelt
Taxa named by Sergey Kondratyuk